Vince Edwards (born Vincent Edward Zoine; July 9, 1928 – March 11, 1996) was an American actor and director. He was best known for his TV role as doctor Ben Casey and as Major Cliff Bricker in the 1968 war film The Devil's Brigade.

Early life 

Edwards was born in the Brownsville section of Brooklyn, New York City, New York, to Julia and Vincento Zoine, an Italian-American bricklayer. He and his twin brother, Anthony, were the youngest of seven children.

He studied aviation mechanics at East New York Vocational High School, graduating in June 1945.

An excellent swimmer, he worked as a lifeguard at Coney Island and swam for the Flatbush Boys Club. He was a standout on his high school swim team, also playing on the school's baseball and track teams. He studied at Ohio State University on an athletic scholarship. He was part of the university's swim team that won the United States National Championships. After two years at Ohio State, he transferred to the University of Hawaii where he spent much time training as a swimmer for the Olympics.

While in college he was involved in theater productions.

Career

Edwards studied acting at the American Academy of Dramatic Arts; his classmates included Anne Bancroft, John Cassavetes, and Grace Kelly. In 1950, he was signed to a contract by Paramount Pictures, making his film debut as Vincent Edwards in 1951's Mister Universe. The following year he played the lead role in Hiawatha. Although he had major roles in several films, including film noirs The Killing (1956) and Murder by Contract (1958), it was not until he was featured as the title character in the highly successful Ben Casey television series that he achieved stardom. The medical drama, which he occasionally directed, ran from 1961 to 1966. As a result of the show's success and his own popularity, Edwards released several music albums and appeared in the all-star war film The Victors in 1963.  He was represented by one of Hollywood's first "super agents", Abby Greshler of Diamond Artists in Hollywood.

When the Ben Casey television series ended, Edwards returned to acting in motion pictures with a major role in the 1968 war drama The Devil's Brigade, together with films such as Hammerhead (1968), The Desperados (1969), and The Mad Bomber (1973). In 1970, Edwards starred in another TV series, the short-lived Matt Lincoln. In 1983, he played the main protagonist, Hawk, in the sci-fi film Space Raiders. He continued to act in film as well as in guest spots on television, including roles in The Rhinemann Exchange (1977), Evening in Byzantium (1978), and the pilot episode of Knight Rider, Knight Of The Phoenix in 1982. He directed a number of episodes in a variety of television series including the original Battlestar Galactica. He was also the voice of Jake Rockwell in the 1986 animated series Centurions. Twenty-two years after the series ended, Edwards returned to television as Dr. Ben Casey in a 1988 TV movie, The Return of Ben Casey. He made his last film, The Fear, in 1995. After the filming he was diagnosed with pancreatic cancer. During his acting career he ventured occasionally into the recording studios and there were a number of singles released in his name.  The most important one was never issued and in 1959 Ray Peterson was credited with the first version of "The Wonder of You" which became an International Hit for him and Elvis Presley - however, the very first recording was made by Vince Edwards.

Gambling

Edwards was a compulsive gambler for many years, acknowledging the fact to a longtime friend, director William Friedkin, who said that he had "sacrificed a good portion of his career to an addiction."

In his last years, Edwards and his wife Janet attempted to educate others about the dangers of gambling. After his death, his wife said, "One of the messages that Vince wanted to share is that gambling is NOT glamorous, despite today's suave-sounding euphemisms, such as 'gaming.

Death

Edwards died of pancreatic cancer in Los Angeles, California, on March 11, 1996. He was buried at the Holy Cross Cemetery in Culver City, California.

Selected filmography

 1951 Mister Universe as Tommy Tomkins (as Vincent Edwards)
 1952 Sailor Beware as Blayden (as Vincent Edwards)
 1952 Hiawatha as Hiawatha (as Vincent Edwards)
 1954 Rogue Cop as Joey Langley
 1955 Cell 2455, Death Row as Hamilton
 1955 The Night Holds Terror as Victor Gosset
 1956 Private's Progress as German Officer (uncredited)
 1956 Serenade as Marco Roselli
 1956 The Killing as Val Cannon
 1957 Hit and Run as Frank
 1957 The Three Faces of Eve as Army Sergeant (uncredited)
 1957 The Hired Gun as Kell Beldon
 1957 Ride Out for Revenge as Chief Little Wolf
 1958 Island Women as Mike
 1958 Murder by Contract as Claude
 1959 City of Fear as Vince Ryker
 1959 The Scavengers as Stuart Allison
 1961 Too Late Blues as Tommy Sheehan (as Vincent Edwards)
 1961 The Outsider as George
 1963 The Victors as Private George Baker (as Vincent Edwards)
 1968 Hammerhead as Charles Hood
 1968 The Devil's Brigade as Major Cliff Bricker
 1969 The Desperados as David Galt
 1970 Sole Survivor as Major Michael Devlin
 1973 The Mad Bomber as Lieutenant Geronimo Minneli
 1977 The Rhinemann Exchange (TV Movie) as General Swanson
 1978 Evening in Byzantium (TV Movie) as Bret Easton
 1982 The Seduction as Maxwell
 1983 Space Raiders as "Hawk"
 1983 Deal of the Century as Frank Stryker
 1985 The Fix as Frank Lane
 1985 Tales from the Darkside as Henry Gropper - "It All Comes Out in the Wash" episode
 1986 Sno-Line as Steve King
 1987 Return to Horror High as Richard Birnbaum
 1987 The Dirty Dozen: The Deadly Mission (TV Movie) as Sergeant Holt
 1988 Cellar Dweller as Norman Meshelski
 1991 Son of Darkness: To Die for II as Police Honcho
 1991 Motorama as Doctor
 1993 King B: A Life in the Movies as Himself
 1995 The Fear as Uncle Pete (final film role)

References

External links

"Vince Edwards" at Brian's Drive-In Theater

1928 births
1996 deaths
20th-century American male actors
20th-century American male singers
20th-century American singers
American male film actors
American male television actors
American people of Italian descent
American television directors
Burials at Holy Cross Cemetery, Culver City
Deaths from cancer in California
Deaths from pancreatic cancer
Male actors from New York City
Musicians from Brooklyn
Ohio State University alumni
Paramount Pictures contract players
People from Brownsville, Brooklyn